The Gangster (aka Low Company) is a 1947 American crime film noir starring Barry Sullivan, Belita, Joan Lorring and Akim Tamiroff.  It was directed by Gordon Wiles, with a screenplay by Daniel Fuchs, based on his novel Low Company (1937).

Plot
Shubunka is a racketeer preying upon small-time operators on the New Jersey boardwalk. He has a girlfriend, Nancy Starr, a showgirl, and offers protection to a New York beachfront cafe owned by Nick Jammey.  A more powerful rival, Cornell, seeks to take over Shubunka's operations and territory.

Karty, a regular customer, has gambling debts and has stolen money from his brothers-in-law's garage. He begs Shubunka for help but is refused. Dorothy, the cafe's cashier, quits her job, disillusioned by Shubunka's involvement in the rackets and concern for no one but himself.

Cornell wants to take over Shubunka's rackets. Jammey gives him inside information on Shubunka's organization. After a couple of Cornell's men beat him up on a picnic, Shubunka angrily accuses Nancy of having him set up. Karty has disappeared, meantime, but when his frantic wife appeals to Shubunka for help, he again infuriates Dorothy by saying no.

Karty gets into a fight with Jammey at the cafe and accidentally kills him with a skillet. Cornell mistakenly believes Shubunka to be responsible and goes after him. This time Nancy does betray Shubunka, having been bribed with a Broadway stage offer by Cornell.

Shubunka runs to Dorothy for help, but she declines, calling it just deserts for his unwillingness to help anyone else. With nowhere to hide, Shubunka is killed by Cornell in the street, just before the police arrive to place Cornell under arrest.

Cast
 Barry Sullivan as Shubunka
 Belita as Nancy Starr
 Joan Lorring as Dorothy
 Akim Tamiroff as Nick Jammey
 Harry Morgan as Shorty
 John Ireland as Karty
 Sheldon Leonard as Cornell
 Fifi D'Orsay as Mrs. Ostroleng
 Virginia Christine as Mrs. Karty
 Elisha Cook Jr. as Oval
 Ted Hecht as Swain
 Leif Erickson (actor) as Beaumont
 Charles McGraw as Dougas
 John Kellogg as Sterling
 Shelley Winters as Hazel (Uncredited)

Reception

Film critic Dennis Schwartz gave the film a mixed review, writing, "A Poverty Row crime melodrama that has its moments of traditional crime, but moves along not in the traditional way of tracing the rise and fall of its protagonist. Instead the film noir is more concerned with establishing a forlorn mood and being artistically stylish, as director Gordon Wiles (won an Oscar as art director for the 1931 Transatlantic) creates a theatrical piece that is unnecessarily stagelike and much too pretentious for the modest storyline. It is adapted by screenwriter Daniel Fuchs from his book Low Company, and much of its too arty nature is attributed by rumor to the uncredited role Dalton Trumbo played in the screenplay."

TV Guide gave the film a positive review, writing, "The Gangster is an offbeat entry in the film noir genre, one that places the accent on the psychological. Though at times muddled, the script strives to maintain a deeper approach than such films as The Public Enemy or Al Capone. In its day this film was considered something of an artistic triumph..."

Film historian Blake Lucas, discussed the film noir aspects of the film, writing, ...The Gangster is arty and affected, as director Gordon Wiles has gravitated toward the creation of a theatrical rather than a visual impression.  A film - and the most visually exciting of film noir bear this out - can show discernment and restraint when there are pretentious aspects implicit in the material."

References

External links
 
 
 
 The Gangster informational site and DVD review at DVD beaver (includes images)
 
Review of film at Variety

1947 films
1947 crime drama films
Allied Artists films
American black-and-white films
American crime drama films
American crime thriller films
Films based on American novels
Film noir
Films directed by Gordon Wiles
1940s crime thriller films
1940s English-language films
1940s American films